William Augustus Stearns (March 17, 1805 – June 8, 1876) was a 19th-century American Reformed minister and teacher who served as president of Amherst College from 1854 to 1876.

Biography
William A. Stearns was born in Bedford, Massachusetts on March 17, 1805. He graduated from Harvard College in 1827 and then Andover Seminary in 1831. Stearns served as pastor of Prospect Street Congregational Church from 1831 to 1854 when he left to become president of Amherst College. He served as president from 1854 until his death in 1876 and was one of the school's longest serving presidents. His son Wilfrid Alden Stearns was an amateur naturalist who wrote several books.

He died in Springfield, Massachusetts on June 8, 1876.

References

External links
William Augustus Stearns, A discourse on educated manhood: delivered to the students of Amherst College, August 7, 1859, it being the sabbath preceding the graduation of the seniors (Samuel Bowles & Co., 1859).
William Augustus Stearns Papers at the Amherst College Archives & Special Collections

1805 births
1876 deaths
Harvard College alumni
Phillips Academy alumni
Amherst College
Presidents of Amherst College